A list of museums located within Los Angeles County of southern California.

Museums located within the City of Los Angeles, while also within LA County, are found separately listed on the List of museums in Los Angeles, California.

The list includes museums and art galleries — of historical, cultural, ethnic, science, and arts organizations, nonprofit organizations, government departments, university and college facilities, and private or corporate collections — that have galleries, buildings, and or open air spaces with exhibits and works open for public viewing.

It currently does not include virtual museums, although some of the listed physical museums have notable online collections also.

Museums

Current

Former
 Academy of Motion Picture Arts and Sciences Galleries
 Downey Museum of Art, Downey, website, closed in 2009 and seeking new location
 Eames Office, Santa Monica

See also
 List of museums in the City of Los Angeles, California

References

External links

 01
.
Los Angeles, County
L
Museums, County